The M9 is a local bus route that operates along the Avenue C Line (also known as the Houston Street Line), in Manhattan, New York City. The route runs mostly along Essex Street and Avenue C from Battery Park City to Kips Bay. Originally a streetcar line, the Avenue C Line is now part of the M9 route, as well as the M21, which operates on the Houston Street Line. Both the Avenue C and Houston Street segments were served by a single route, the M21, until June 2010. The M9 and M21 are operated by the New York City Transit Authority, and based out of the Michael J. Quill Depot.

History
The Avenue C Railroad (changed to the Houston, West Street and Pavonia Ferry Railroad in the early 1880s) was chartered June 3, 1874, and opened the Avenue C Line on October 18, 1869, connecting the Pavonia Ferry at the foot of Chambers Street with the Green Point Ferry at the foot of East 10th Street. Its route ran along West Street, a one-way pair of Charlton Street, Prince Street, and Stanton Street (eastbound) and Houston Street, 1st Avenue, and 3rd Street (westbound), Pitt Street/Avenue C, and 10th Street. By 1879, the line had been extended north on Avenue C from 10th Street, west on 17th Street (eastbound) and 18th Street (westbound), north over the Central Park, North and East River Railroad (First Avenue and East Belt Line) on Avenue A, 23rd Street, and 1st Avenue, west on 35th Street (westbound) and 36th Street (eastbound), north on Lexington Avenue, and west on 42nd Street to Grand Central Terminal. The Third Avenue Railroad also used the trackage on 42nd Street by 1884.

On November 29, 1893, the Houston, West Street and Pavonia Ferry Railroad was merged into the Metropolitan Street Railway. The line was cut back to Avenue A at 24th Street by 1907; the trackage on 35th and 36th Streets was removed, while the other trackage became parts of the Lexington Avenue Line and 42nd Street Crosstown Line.

Buses were substituted for streetcars in September 1919. Service was suspended, but brought back in March 1929 by the Hamilton Bus Company. The Triangle Bus Corporation took over in 1935, and the New York City Omnibus Corporation acquired the route in 1940. That company changed its name to Fifth Avenue Coach Lines in 1956; the Manhattan and Bronx Surface Transit Operating Authority took over operations in 1962.

In 2010, because of service cuts, the M21 was rerouted from Avenue C to the FDR drive, becoming a river-to-river crosstown line along Houston St. To replace the M21 on Avenue C, the M9, which ran to 14th Street-Union Square via Avenue B and 14th St north of Houston St, was rerouted to Avenue C up to 23rd Street only. In 2013, the M9 was extended to 29th Street at Bellevue Hospital, the original northern terminus of the M21.

References

External links

Streetcar lines in Manhattan
M008
Railway lines opened in 1869
1869 establishments in New York (state)
009